Osadné is a village and municipality in Snina District in the Prešov Region of north-eastern Slovakia.

History
In historical records the village was first mentioned in 1639.

Geography
The municipality lies at an altitude of 385 metres and covers an area of 26.523 km². According to the 2013 census it had a population of 181 inhabitants.

Culture
The village was portrayed in a 2009 documentary film of the same name, directed by Marko Škop. The film won the award for best long-format documentary at the 2009 Karlovy Vary International Film Festival.

References

External links
 
 
 https://web.archive.org/web/20070513023228/http://www.statistics.sk/mosmis/eng/run.html
 "Osadné" documentary homepage

Villages and municipalities in Snina District